The Criminal Minds are a British hip hop group first formed in Milton Keynes, UK in 1985, who would later have success with breakbeat hardcore music during the peak of the early-mid 1990s UK rave scene.

History
The Criminal Minds were first formed in 1985 in Milton Keynes, and formed of the following members: DJ Halo, DJ Spatts, MC Iceski, Chase 1, Safe D, and CMD. They self-funded and self-released their first mini-album Guilty As Charged in 1990, followed by the EP Tales From the Wasteland. Both were hailed within the UK hip hop scene for their rap delivery and clever and diverse use of samples. Due to the complications with getting sample clearance for their releases, they were released in limited numbers only.

As the rave scene gained momentum from 1991, The Criminal Minds teamed up with a local record shop DJ, to fuse their hip hop style with Breakbeat hardcore. This resulted in what is regarded as an all-time classic of the genre Baptised By Dub. For the next few years, a solid release of breakbeat hardcore and early jungle releases would follow.

After a hiatus, The Criminal Minds regrouped to release Widowmaker in 2001.

An anthology/compilation of The Criminal Minds hip hop output was finally released in 2011 by Rephlex Records.

Discography

Albums
 Guilty as Charged (TCM Recordings, 1990)
 Mindbombing (Labello Blanco, 1993)
 Widowmaker (UK Rap Records, 2001)

Selected singles/EPs
 "Tales from the Wasteland" (TCM Recordings, 1991)
 "Baptised by Dub / Virtual Reality" (World Beat Records/White House, 1992)
 "A Vision of Dread / Playing with Spoons / Presence" (White House, 1992)
 "Re-baptised by Dub / Headhunter / Flynny's Theme" (White House, 1992)
 Joyrider EP (White House, 1993)
 "The Criminal" (White House, 1993)

Compilations
 T.C.M. (Rephlex Records, 2011)

See also
 British hip hop
 Breakbeat hardcore

References

External links

BritishHipHop.co.uk - UK Hip Hop History
The Criminal Minds at Heroes of UK Hip Hop

English hip hop groups
Breakbeat hardcore music groups
Musical groups from Buckinghamshire
Rephlex Records artists